Superstition is an American television mystery-drama series that was commissioned by Syfy with a 12-episode direct-to-series order in December 2016. The show premiered on October 20, 2017, with the series' first season concluding on January 18, 2018. On June 6, 2018, the series was cancelled after one season.

Plot
The episodes revolve around the Hastings family who owns and directs a funeral home and the cemetery in the sleepy town of La Rochelle, Georgia. The basement of the family home provides space for the city morgue as well where Tilly, the medical examiner, works. Having long been hunters of the supernatural, the Hastings and Tilly make sure that Infernals don't wreak havoc among the human populace.

Things start to unravel when Friday the 13th arrives, with the appearance of the Hastings' oldest son who left the family sixteen years ago. Supernatural forces begin descending upon the town, with Calvin and his family doing their best to protect everyone.

Cast

Main
Mario Van Peebles as Isaac Hastings
Robinne Lee as Bea Hastings
Brad James as Calvin Hastings, Bea and Isaac's oldest son
Demetria McKinney as May Westbrook, the Chief of Police
Morgana Van Peebles as Garvey Westbrook, May's 16-year-old daughter
Tatiana Lia Zappardino as Tilly, the medical examiner and researcher of all things supernatural for the Hastings

Recurring
W. Earl Brown as The Dredge, the powerful entity out to destroy the Hastings 
T. C. Carter as Russ, Garvey's boyfriend
Jasmine Guy as Aunt Nancy, an unlikely ally to the Hastings family
David E. Collier as Dr. Kim, a doctor who is later possessed by The Dredge
Nick Hagelin as Raymond Patla, the naive yet harmless police deputy
Joaquin Montes as James, a close friend of Isaac's from olden days
Myles Truitt as Arlo, the Hastings' youngest son who died, but reappears in hallucinations

Episodes

Broadcast and release
Netflix holds the international airing rights to Superstition. The series was released on Netflix in the UK and Canada on April 29, 2018.

References

External links
 
 

2010s American drama television series
2017 American television series debuts
2018 American television series endings
English-language television shows
Serial drama television series
Syfy original programming